The 2006 United States state legislative elections were held on November 7, 2006, halfway through President George W. Bush's second term in office. This election was a wave elections in the United States election, and saw Democrats simultaneously reclaim both houses of Congress and pick up six governorships. Elections were held for 90 legislative chambers, with all states but Louisiana, Mississippi, New Jersey, and Virginia holding elections in at least one house. Kansas, New Mexico, and South Carolina held elections for their lower, but not upper house. Four territorial chambers in three territories and the District of Columbia were up, including the newly created territorial legislature in the U.S. Virgin Islands. 

Democrats flipped ten legislative chambers. Democrats gained control of the Oregon House of Representatives, the Minnesota House of Representatives, both houses of the Iowa General Assembly, and both houses of the New Hampshire General Court- for the first time since 1875, giving them complete legislative control over those states. The Iowa Senate was previously tied. Democrats also won majorities in the Wisconsin Senate, the Michigan House of Representatives, the Pennsylvania House of Representatives, and the Indiana House of Representatives, turning those legislatures into split bodies. Additionally, a Democratic-led coalition was created in the Alaska Senate, which was previously a Republican majority. Democrats won a majority of state legislative chambers for the first time since 1995. 

Conversely, Republicans gained control of the Montana House of Representatives with the lone Constitution Party representative voting for Republican control of that body.

Summary table
Regularly-scheduled elections were held in 90 of the 99 state legislative chambers in the United States. Nationwide, regularly-scheduled elections were held for 6,343 of the 7,383 legislative seats. Many legislative chambers held elections for all seats, but some legislative chambers that use staggered elections held elections for only a portion of the total seats in the chamber. The chambers not up for election either hold regularly-scheduled elections in odd-numbered years, or have four-year terms and hold all regularly-scheduled elections in presidential midterm election years.

Note that this table only covers regularly-scheduled elections; additional special elections took place concurrently with these regularly-scheduled elections.

Results

State-by-state

Upper houses

Lower houses

Results

Territorial chambers

Lower houses

Unicameral

Notes

References

 
 
State legislative elections
State legislature elections in the United States by year